The Battle of Ngaundere or Battle of Ngaoundéré was a small engagement fought between German and British forces on 29 June 1915 during the Kamerun campaign of World War I. It resulted in a German defeat and British occupation of the town.

Background
Following the Allied victory and German surrender at the Second Battle of Garua, the commander of French and British forces in the area, General Cunliffe, was confident in pushing deeper into the German colony of Kamerun. He moved a detachment of his force under the command of Lieutenant Colonel Webb-Bowen 150 miles southeast to the town of Ngaundere on the road leading from the north of the colony to the central plateau where the new German capital and concentration of military forces was.

Battle
The small advance unit under the command of Captain Fowle arrived at Ngaundere on 29 June 1915 after marching through a severe storm that produced a tornado. When the main body of the unit arrived, the storm still lingered over the town. As a result, the British troops were able to surprise soldiers stationed at many of the German outposts and take them captive before any fighting occurred. At some of the outposts however, fighting did occur resulting in light casualties to the British unit. After the German force had been driven from Ngaundere, it launched a counterattack which the British repulsed.

Aftermath
The expulsion of German forces from their outposts in Ngaundere meant that significant resistance in the north of Kamerun would be absent. It allowed General Cunliffe's columns the freedom to move further south into the central plateau of the colony. The British did pursue the German forces who had once occupied Ngaundere who withdrew to Tangere. The British took this position without a fight on 12 July and repulsed a German attempt to recapture it on 23 July. The German force withdrew once again in the direction of Tibati. However, due to heavy rains and the remaining German stronghold at Mora, Cunliffe would not continue his advance southward until October. His force arrived on 23 August to assist in the Siege of Mora which would last until the end of the campaign.

Notes

References
Bryce, James B., Holland Thomson, and William M.F. Petrie. The Book of History: The Causes of the War. The Events of 1914-1915. Vol. 16. N.p.: Grolier Society, 1920. Google Books. 30 Oct. 2007. Web. 28 Dec. 2012.
Dane, Edmund. British Campaigns in Africa and the Pacific, 1914-1918,. London: Hodder and Stoughton, 1919. Google Books. 12 June 2008. Web. 2 Jan. 2013. <https://books.google.com/books?id=h05nAAAAMAAJ&printsec=frontcover#v=onepage&q&f=false>.
Hilditch, A. N. Battle Sketches, 1914–1915. Oxford University Press, 1915.
Wood, Leonard, Austin M. Knight, Frederick Palmer, Frank H. Simonds, and Arthur B. Ruhl. The Story of the Great War: With Complete Historical Record of Events to Date. Ed. Francis J. Reynolds, Allen L. Churchill, and Francis T. Miller. Vol. 6. N.p.: P.F. Collier & Sons, 1916. Google Books. Web. 28 Dec. 2012.

Battles of World War I involving Germany
Battles of World War I involving the United Kingdom
1915 in Africa
African theatre of World War I
Battles of the African Theatre (World War I)
Military history of Cameroon
Kamerun
Battles of the Kamerun campaign
Conflicts in 1915
June 1915 events
1910s in Kamerun